Raymond Dayle Rowsey (April 11, 1971 – January 9, 2004) was an American murderer who was convicted of the 1992 murder of Howard Rue Sikorski. He was executed in 2004 at Central Prison in Raleigh, North Carolina by lethal injection.

Crime
Rowsey was implicated in the murder of Howard Rue Sikorski, an Alamance County convenience store clerk. Sikorski's body was discovered in the early morning of 24 March 1992. Sikorski had suffered six gunshot wounds; cash totaling $57.54 and several adult magazines was taken from the store. Raymond Steele, Rowsey's half-brother, was arrested upon attempting to use a two-dollar bill tracked following the robbery by its serial number. During questioning, he implicated Rowsey in the murder and robbery, and Rowsey was arrested the following day.

Trial
Steele, as part of a plea bargain in which he confessed to second-degree murder, implicated Rowsey as the shooter, testifying that he was at the store with Rowsey and witness the shooting. The prosecution at Rowsey's trial presented evidence that Rowsey was in possession of the murder weapon both before and after the murder; however, there were no other witnesses. While a shoeprint found near the victim was found to match Rowsey, suggesting his presence at the store, two fellow prisoners in the county jail testified that they had heard Steele say that Rowsey did not, in fact, fire the shots which killed Sikorski.

A jury convicted Rowsey and recommended a death sentence. During sentencing, the prosecution introduced evidence of Rowsey's extensive criminal record, while the defense presented evidence of a difficult childhood. Following the trial, juror Eleanor Lee came forward, claiming that she opposed recommending the death penalty in Rowsey's case, but was intimidated by other jurors. When questioned by the trial judge during sentencing, Lee was hesitant to respond, and, after being asked if she understood the question, responded "yes" to the judge. The judge and prosecutors claimed that she was responding in agreement with the verdict, a claim contested by defense attorney's after the sentence was entered. State law prevents altering a sentence once it has been entered, and Lee's testimony never came to court.

Execution
Days prior to the scheduled execution, Rowsey and several other North Carolina death row inmates filed a federal class-action lawsuit regarding the constitutionality of the state's procedures for lethal injection. The lawsuit alleged that the combination of drugs administered left open the possibility that an individual being executed could regain consciousness prior to death, leaving him paralyzed but in intense pain prior to death, and thus in violation of the eighth amendment injunction preventing "cruel and unusual punishment." Similar lawsuits had already been filed in four other states, but none had yet reached an ultimate verdict.

U.S. District Court Judge Terrence Boyle ordered a stay of execution on 7 January 2004 pending resolution of the case; the stay was upheld by a 2–1 decision of the 4th U.S. Circuit Court on the afternoon of 8 January 2004. Nevertheless, preparations for Rowsey's execution, previously scheduled for the morning of 9 January 2004 continued. He met with his attorneys and family, and was able to hold his 11-year-old daughter for the first time since entering prison. However, the state of North Carolina had immediately appealed the Circuit Court's decision to the U.S. Supreme Court, and, at 7:55 p.m. on 9 January, just six hours before the time of execution, the Supreme Court, in a 5–4 decision, lifted the stay and allowed the execution to continue. Shortly before midnight, North Carolina Governor Mike Easley refused to grant clemency in Rowsey's case, and the execution took place two hours later.

Rowsey's last meal prior to his execution was pizza, chicken wings, two packages of peanut M&M's, and a Pepsi. He gave no final statement. Rowsey was pronounced dead at North Carolina's Central Prison in Raleigh at 2:23 a.m. in the early morning of January 9, 2004. His execution was the 888th carried out in the United States since the death penalty was reinstated in 1976, and the 31st in North Carolina.

See also
 Capital punishment in North Carolina
 Capital punishment in the United States
 List of people executed in North Carolina
 List of people executed in the United States in 2004

General references
 clarkprosecutor.org

1971 births
2004 deaths
People executed for murder
21st-century executions of American people
21st-century executions by North Carolina
People executed by North Carolina by lethal injection
People convicted of murder by North Carolina
American people convicted of murder